Elemental is the seventh studio album by British new wave band the Fixx, released in 1998.

Track listing
All songs are written by Cy Curnin, Rupert Greenall, Jamie West-Oram, and Adam Woods.

"Two Different Views" – 4:12
"Going Without"  – 4:30
"Is That It?" – 3:54
"Happy Landings" – 4:22
"Silent House" – 4:08
"Fatal Shore" – 4:39
"Ocean Blue" – 4:51
"You Know Me" – 3:51
"We Once Held Hands" – 3:56
"Life's What's Killing Me" – 3:57

Personnel
Cy Curnin – vocals
Adam Woods – drums
Rupert Greenall – keyboards
Jamie West-Oram – guitar

Additional personnel
Dennis Bovell – bass
Geoffrey Scantlebury – percussion
Liz Skillings – vocals
Chris Tait – bass

Production
Producers: The Fixx, Martin Rex, Chris Stone
Engineers: Martin Rex, Chris Stone
Mixing: Steve Churchyard
Mixing assistant: Tye Bellar
Mastering: Stephen Marcussen
Editing: Mike Childers
Digital editing: Don C. Tyler

Notes 

The Fixx albums
1998 albums
CMC International albums